Prince Moulay Ismail of Morocco (born 6 May 1981) is the son of Prince Moulay Abdallah and Lalla Lamia Solh. His mother is daughter of Riad Al Solh, the first Prime minister of Lebanon. The Prince has one older brother, Prince Moulay Hicham.

On 25 September 2009, he married Anissa Lehmkuhl, the daughter of Lieutenant-Colonel Omar Lehmkuhl and his wife, Amina (German citizens converted to Islamic faith). They had issue, one son and three daughters: 

Business
Prince Ismail owns Theora holding, which has a 35% stake in the now-defunct KIA Maroc (exclusive dealer of KIA cars in Morocco) and also co-owns a number of food & restaurants franchises such as Pizza Del Arte (subsidiary of Groupe Le Duff).

His name is mentioned in the Panama Papers leak

Patronages 
 Honorary President of the Hand in Hand Association.

References

Moroccan royalty
People from Rabat
1981 births
Living people
Moroccan people of Lebanese descent
Moroccan people of Arab descent
Moroccan princes
People from Beirut
Moroccan businesspeople